In 1967, French TV broadcast a dramatised adaptation of the series, Les Aventures de Michel Vaillant by Jean Graton. 13 episodes in total, it featured stories written and filmed around the real life World Sportscar Championship, documenting Henri Grandsire driving an Alpine 110, interspersed with dramatic interludes acted by Grandsire himself. Episodes offer close up rare contemporary footage of races and cars that year at the Rallye Du Nord, Magny Cours, Nürburgring, Monza, Targa Florio, Le Mans, Monaco, Rouen-Les-Essarts, Sebring and Reims.

External links

French documentary television series
French sports television series
French drama television series
1967 French television series debuts
1967 French television series endings
1960s French television series
Television series based on French comics
Michel Vaillant